In Greek mythology, Chthonophyle (Ancient Greek: Χθονοφύλη) was the daughter of King Sicyon (whose name was given to the city of Sicyon) and Zeuxippe. She and Hermes are the parents of Polybus, another king of Sicyon. She married Phlias, son of Dionysus and Araethyrea, and had by him another son, Androdamas. Other sources instead give her, and not Araethyrea, as the mother of Phlias with Dionysus.

Notes

References 

 Pausanias, Description of Greece with an English Translation by W.H.S. Jones, Litt.D., and H.A. Ormerod, M.A., in 4 Volumes. Cambridge, MA, Harvard University Press; London, William Heinemann Ltd. 1918. . Online version at the Perseus Digital Library
 Pausanias, Graeciae Descriptio. 3 vols. Leipzig, Teubner. 1903.  Greek text available at the Perseus Digital Library.

 Stephanus of Byzantium, Stephani Byzantii Ethnicorum quae supersunt, edited by August Meineike (1790-1870), published 1849. A few entries from this important ancient handbook of place names have been translated by Brady Kiesling. Online version at the Topos Text Project.

Women of Hermes
Princesses in Greek mythology
Consorts of Dionysus